Civil-police relations describes the relationship between civilians as a whole and the police force employed by the government. The police are law enforcements officers tasked with maintaining peace in the society. Among other public servants, police have the most contact with civilians, thus closely affecting the lives of civilians. Civilians and police rely on each other to maintain a harmonious society. While it is in the best interest of both parties to cooperate with each other, the relationship between them is not always harmonious. Different civilians of different countries have different relationships with their police forces. The relationships are diverse and complex. There is no uniform linearity in the relationships. One theory suggest that the police agencies reflect the beliefs and values of the society, thus the civilians are the one who ultimately set the benchmark for civil-police relations. Different police forces use different style of policing, thus there is a variation in the civil-police relations too. Public relations style of policing tend to be more favoured by civilians than intensive military style of policing.

Civil-police relations draws upon a diverse fields including political science, law, criminology, criminal justice, philosophy, sociology, economics, psychology, cultural studies, and history. Many subjects and issues are explored under the concept of civil-police relations including police legitimacy, public administration, community policing, democratic policing, policing terrorism, racial disparities, and societal standards.

Policing is believed to be inseparable from politics as police act under the authority of whichever government is in power. Thus, civil-police relations is also said to be the mirror of the relationship between the civilians and the government. The state of the police-civil relations is ultimately said to be measure of a country's democracy.

Civil-police relations

History 

During the Anglo-Saxon era, the King assumed the role of the commander-in-chief of the police. The main task of the police was to ensure that there was peace and orderliness in the society. The then ruling monarch of England maintained that it wanted its police force to be local and mutual. These qualities are still desired in the police force today.

The civilians were typically submissive the monarch and those associated with it, following the said rules and regulations obediently. The civilians did as they were told given that the position the police had in the society was authoritative. There was not any significant tension between civilians and the police, as there was no room for civilians to voice out against whatever rules and regulations were imposed.

More formal history of the police force dates as far back as 1800 in the UK and other European Countries. The role and responsibilities of the police force are consistently revisited and redefined. The purpose of keeping peace in the society remained. Three models of police force have been acknowledged as huge influences to the current model of policing: 1) The French's model with dual military and civil function 2) The Irish's dominantly state military model 3) The British's state civilian model. The British's model was an extension of the Irish's model. All three models have evolved. The British's model of police being intentionally different from the military has been adopted by many countries, including the U.S.

In the early twentieth century Scotland, the civilians and the police force had an individualised and interpersonal relationship. They relied on the trust they had on each other to maintain peace. By late twentieth century, the police force had established a more formal relationship with the civilians, stressing more on procedures and structure.

Contemporary relations 
Civil-police relations differs from one country to another.  Democratic countries with liberal views are more likely to have amicable relations with their police forces. Even within a country, different communities have different relationships with the police force. Within a community, many factors affect the relationship between these two stakeholders. Among others; cultural, social and economic.

While it is commonly understood that the police are to serve the civilians, there have been disputes regarding who they actually serve. In the U.S., there are concerns as the police are getting increasingly militarised, involved with counter-insurgency, and even privatised.

In present times, the police force has consistently garnered negative press, which has made the civil-police relations worse off. Among others, fatal police shootings, mishandling of public protests, and racial and ethnic discrimination have been contributing factors to the civilians' distrust in the police force.

The Press has more freedom, and the civilians have more rights in the modern times. They have more opinions on what they feel about the operation of the police force. In a democratic society, civilians are no longer willing to be submissive to whatever rules and regulations they are asked to follow. There is a demand for transparency and accountability from all, especially those who hold power.

The police force often retaliates the civilians' sentiment, arguing that their job is thankless and severely underappreciated. The direction that the police force takes is often controlled externally. It has no extraordinary power or insured from exemptions as any ordinary civilian.

Controversies 

Police-involved deaths have been escalating in several countries. Police-involved deaths in the U.S. often gain international media coverage, further staining the image of the police internationally. With the escalation of police shootings rising, the police-civil relations has strained severely.

There have been increasing concern with regard to the conduct of the police force, whether they treat civilians fairly and respectfully. With the rise of police-involved deaths influenced racial profiling and political tension in the U.S., the civilians’ perspective of the police force is radically negative. It has been statistically proven that minorities  are more in danger of being the victims of police killings.

Many high-profile violence led by police have traumatised the civilians and have made them more distrustful of the police force, hindering the maintenance of peace in a society. Some of the high-profile events that help define the contemporary relations between the two parties in the present times are Black Lives Matter movement, the police killing of Brown, the police killing of Eric Garner, and the Baltimore case. These controversies have reduced the image of the police to that of power and authority abusers, and they have garnered the reputation of failing the very civilians that it is employed to protect.

Across countries 
Other countries that have volatile civil-police relations include Hong Kong, Israel, and Philippines. In these countries, there has been a significant shift with relation to how the public regards its police.

Hong Kong 

In Hong Kong, before the Occupy Central movement, police-led violence is rare, and police were generally well-respected. However, following the Occupy Central movement, one of the most high-profile civil disobedience movements in Hong Kong, the civil-police relations have dramatically tarnished. The student-led movement called for an electoral system in Hong Kong, free from China's influence. The police's use of teargas and other forms of brutality to handle the protestors have led the general consensus among civilians to be that the police is highly influenced by the government, although the law forbids the mainland to interfere with Hong Kong's local law enforcement affairs. In addition, seven police officers were charged with regard to "intentionally inflicting grievous bodily harm" to Ken Tsang, a protestor in the Occupy Central movement.  This incident of police brutality gained wide attention in Hong Kong, as the brutality was caught on tape, and broadcast to Hong Kong audiences by Television Broadcast Limited. Hong Kong people strongly condemned the police for abusing their authority. Following the Occupy movement, and the beating of Ken Tsang, the Hong Kong police gained a more negative reputation. In response to this newly found reputation, the police showed their frustration citing that they were being treated unfairly due to some isolated incidents, comparing their treatment to that of Jews' by the Nazi. The police community came together to protest the sentiment towards them, as well as to show support to the seven convicted police officers. Many high-profile pro-Beijing politicians chose to publicly condemn the conviction of the seven police officers, reasoning that the police were provoked by Tsang.

Following the rise in large-scale protests, a new police division was set up with one of the tasks being handling activities caused by "public events and disasters". Many lawmakers and activists feared that this will further hinder the civil-police relations.

The 2019 protests against the extradition bill further created divide between the civilians and the police. After protestors breached the police lines and started throwing objects at the police, the police reacted by firing unprecedented amount of tear gas canisters, rubber bullets, and beanbag shots. The level of force used to clear the protestors was widely condemned by the public, and Amnesty International declared the police actions to be in violation of international law, as police used excess violence to handle the peaceful protestors. The police were caught on tape firing tear gas canister at reporters despite no protestors being around them, which led to Hong Kong press watchdog filing a complaint against the police for breaching the Hong Kong's Basic Law. The press protested against such police actions by attending a press conference held by police chief commissioner with regard to the protests, by wearing safety jackets, helmets and gas masks. Following the backlash from the public for their excessive use of violence and labelling the protests a riot, the police were noticeably using less force in the later protests, and admitted in a press conference that most of the protestors were peaceful, and thus the protests cannot be called a riot.

Israel 

Israeli people's public support for its own police force has been dropping. As Israeli police force are becoming more actively involved in counterterrorism, the Israeli civilians find it difficult to distinguish between its police force and the military. Since historically, the military and the police have had different relations with their civilians, with police having a more community-like relationship, and the military more authoritative, there has been confusion as to where the civil-police relations stand in Israel. The civilians have been critical with regard to the close proximity of the operation between policing and militarisation in Israel. The Israeli police's heavy involvement with counterterrorism has received condemnation from the civilians for being negligent with what the police's main task should be, to deal with local, day-to-day community problems. The police's involvement with counterterrorism is so significant that it has exchange programs with other countries to train their police counterterrorism strategies. This public grows more anxious, and is distrustful and suspicious of the police as a result of their strong stance on counterterrorism policing.

Philippines 

In the Philippines, under president Duterte's drug crackdown, the police force has killed over 5000 Filipinos, including children.  Among others, the police has been accused of sexual assaults, falsifying crimes, unlawful killings, planting evidences, and even robbing victims' houses. The anti-drug police operations have led to an escalation in police-led violent deaths. The aftermath of such operations has stained civil-police relations severely, leading the public to be restful towards the police. Public remains distrustful of the police. The police is heavily criticised for abusing power by oppressing the civilians, especially the poor, under the guise of enforcing laws.

See also 

Law enforcement
Police force
 Community policing
Police brutality
Police corruption
Civil-military relations

References 

Law enforcement